Niji may refer to:
 USS Niji (SP-33), a United States Navy patrol boat in commission from 1917 to 1919
 "Niji" (AAA song) (2012)
 "Niji" (album), Yui Aragaki 2010 album
 "Niji" (Fujifabric song) (2005)
 "Niji" (L'Arc-en-Ciel song) (1997)
 "Niji/Himawari/Sore ga Subete sa", a 2003 song by Masaharu Fukuyama
 "Niji", a 1995 song by Denki Groove
 Niji Entertainment, Ronnie James Dio's recording company
 Niji Music, Ronnie James Dio's music publishing company
 Vinsmoke Niji, a fictional character in the One Piece manga and anime series
 Niji, Huarong District (泥矶乡), former township in Ezhou, Hubei